Heterophrictus is a genus of Indian tarantulas that was first described by Reginald Innes Pocock in 1900.

Species
 it contains four species, found in India:
Heterophrictus aareyensis Mirza & Sanap, 2014 – India
Heterophrictus blatteri (Gravely, 1935) – India
Heterophrictus milleti Pocock, 1900 (type) – India
Heterophrictus raveni Mirza & Sanap, 2014 – India

In synonymy:
H. mahabaleshwari (Tikader, 1977, Tikader, 1977) = Heterophrictus blatteri (Gravely, 1935)

See also
 List of Theraphosidae species

References

Theraphosidae genera
Spiders of the Indian subcontinent
Taxa named by R. I. Pocock
Theraphosidae